In numerical analysis, numerical differentiation algorithms estimate the derivative of a mathematical function or function subroutine using values of the function and perhaps other knowledge about the function.

Finite differences

The simplest method is to use finite difference approximations.

A simple two-point estimation is to compute the slope of a nearby secant line through the points (x, f(x)) and (x + h, f(x + h)). Choosing a small number h,  h represents a small change in x, and it can be either positive or negative.  The slope of this line is
 
This expression is Newton's difference quotient (also known as a first-order divided difference).

The slope of this secant line differs from the slope of the tangent line by an amount that is approximately proportional to h. As h approaches zero, the slope of the secant line approaches the slope of the tangent line. Therefore, the true derivative of f at x is the limit of the value of the difference quotient as the secant lines get closer and closer to being a tangent line:
 

Since immediately substituting 0 for h results in  indeterminate form , calculating the derivative directly can be unintuitive.

Equivalently, the slope could be estimated by employing positions (x − h) and x.

Another two-point formula is to compute the slope of a nearby secant line through the points (x - h, f(x − h)) and (x + h, f(x + h)). The slope of this line is
 

This formula is known as the symmetric difference quotient. Hence for small values of h this is a more accurate approximation to the tangent line than the one-sided estimation. However, although the slope is being computed at x, the value of the function at x is not involved.

The estimation error is given by

 ,

This error does not include the rounding error due to numbers being represented and calculations being performed in limited precision.

The symmetric difference quotient is employed as the method of approximating the derivative in a number of calculators, including TI-82, TI-83, TI-84, TI-85, all of which use this method with h = 0.001.

Step size

An important consideration in practice when the function is calculated using floating-point arithmetic of finite precision is the choice of step size, h. If chosen too small, the subtraction will yield a large rounding error. In fact, all the finite-difference formulae are ill-conditioned and due to cancellation will produce a value of zero if h is small enough. If too large, the calculation of the slope of the secant line will be more accurately calculated, but the estimate of the slope of the tangent by using the secant could be worse.

For basic central differences, the optimal step is the cube-root of machine epsilon.
A formula for h that balances the rounding error against the secant error for optimum accuracy is

 

(though not when ), and to employ it will require knowledge of the function.

For computer calculations the problems are exacerbated because, although x necessarily holds a representable floating-point number in some precision (32 or 64-bit, etc.), x + h almost certainly will not be exactly representable in that precision. This means that x + h will be changed (by rounding or truncation) to a nearby machine-representable number, with the consequence that (x + h) − x will not equal h; the two function evaluations will not be exactly h apart. In this regard, since most decimal fractions are recurring sequences in binary (just as 1/3 is in decimal) a seemingly round step such as h = 0.1 will not be a round number in binary; it is 0.000110011001100...2 A possible approach is as follows:
  h := sqrt(eps) * x;
  xph := x + h;
  dx := xph - x;
  slope := (F(xph) - F(x)) / dx;
However, with computers, compiler optimization facilities may fail to attend to the details of actual computer arithmetic and instead apply the axioms of mathematics to deduce that dx and h are the same. With C and similar languages, a directive that xph is a volatile variable will prevent this.

Other methods

Higher-order methods

Higher-order methods for approximating the derivative, as well as methods for higher derivatives, exist.

Given below is the five-point method for the first derivative (five-point stencil in one dimension):
 
where .

For other stencil configurations and derivative orders, the Finite Difference Coefficients Calculator is a tool that can be used to generate derivative approximation methods for any stencil with any derivative order (provided a solution exists).

Higher derivatives 
Using Newton's difference quotient,

 

the following can be shown (for n>0):

Complex-variable methods

The classical finite-difference approximations for numerical differentiation are ill-conditioned. However, if  is a holomorphic function, real-valued on the real line, which can be evaluated at points in the complex plane near , then there are stable methods. For example, the first derivative can be calculated by the complex-step derivative formula:

This formula can be obtained by Taylor series expansion:

The complex-step derivative formula is only valid for calculating first-order derivatives. A generalization of the above for calculating derivatives of any order employs multicomplex numbers, resulting in multicomplex derivatives.

where the  denote the multicomplex imaginary units; . The  operator extracts the th component of a multicomplex number of level , e.g.,  extracts the real component and  extracts the last, “most imaginary” component. The method can be applied to mixed derivatives, e.g. for a second-order derivative

A C++ implementation of multicomplex arithmetics is available.

In general, derivatives of any order can be calculated using Cauchy's integral formula:

 

where the integration is done numerically.

Using complex variables for numerical differentiation was started by Lyness and Moler in 1967. Their algorithm is applicable to higher-order derivatives.

A method based on numerical inversion of a complex Laplace transform was developed by Abate and Dubner. An algorithm that can be used without requiring knowledge about the method or the character of the function was developed by Fornberg.

Differential quadrature
Differential quadrature is the approximation of derivatives by using weighted sums of function values. Differential quadrature is of practical interest because its allows one to compute derivatives from noisy data. The name is in analogy with quadrature, meaning numerical integration, where weighted sums are used in methods such as Simpson's method or the Trapezoidal rule. There are various methods for determining the weight coefficients, for example, the Savitzky–Golay filter. Differential quadrature is used to solve partial differential equations.
There are further methods for computing derivatives from noisy data.

See also

List of numerical-analysis software

References

External links 

 Numerical Differentiation from wolfram.com
Numerical Differentiation Resources: Textbook notes, PPT, Worksheets, Audiovisual YouTube Lectures at Numerical Methods for STEM Undergraduate
 Fortran code for the numerical differentiation of a function using Neville's process to extrapolate from a sequence of simple polynomial approximations.
 NAG Library numerical differentiation routines
 http://graphulator.com Online numerical graphing calculator with calculus function.
 Boost. Math numerical differentiation, including finite differencing and the complex step derivative
Complex Step Differentiation
Differentiation With(out) a Difference by Nicholas Higham, SIAM News.
findiff Python project

Numerical analysis
Differential calculus